

Events
 Mapungubwe flourished as a trading center in modern-day Limpopo province throughout the century. It receded in importance by 1270.

Reference 

History of South Africa